The following is a list of reptiles of South Asia, primarily covering the region covered by mainland India, Pakistan, Nepal, Sri Lanka, Bangladesh, Bhutan, parts of Myanmar and the Andaman and Nicobar Island chains.

Order Crocodilia

Family Crocodilidae 
 Mugger crocodile (Crocodylus palustris) India, Pakistan, Nepal, Sri Lanka, Bangladesh, Myanmar
 Saltwater crocodile (Crocodylus porosus) India (east coast and the Andamans), Sri Lanka, Myanmar, Thailand, Malaysia, Bangladesh

Family Gavialiidae 

 Gharial Gavialis gangeticus India, Pakistan, Nepal, Bangladesh
 False gharial Tomistoma schlegelii Malaysia, Borneo, Sumatra, Java

Order Testudines

Family Dermochelyidae 
 Leatherback sea turtle Dermochelys coriacea global

Family Cheloniidae 
 Loggerhead sea turtle Caretta caretta tropical regions
 Green turtle Chelonia mydas tropical regions
 Hawksbill sea turtle Eretmochelys imbricata tropical regions
 Olive ridley sea turtle Lepidochelys olivacea tropical regions
 Flatback turtle Natator depressus

Family Testudinidae 
 Indian star tortoise (Geochelone elegans) India
 Elongated tortoise (Indotestudo elongata) India, Nepal, Bangladesh, Myanmar, Malay peninsula, Indo-China
 Travancore tortoise (Indotestudo travancorica) Western Ghats
 Asian brown tortoise (Manouria emys) India, Bangladesh, Malay region
 Impressed tortoise (Manouria impressa) India (Arunachal Pradesh)
 Central Asian tortoise (Testudo horsfieldii) Pakistan

Family Geoemydidae 

 River terrapin Batagur baska India (Sundarbans, Bhitarkanika), Bangladesh, Malay peninsula, Indo-China, Sumatra
 Malayan box turtle Cuora amboinensis India (Northeast, Nicobar Islands) Bangladesh, Malay peninsula, Indo-China, the Sundas, Maluku, Philippines
 Asian leaf turtle Cyclemys dentata Northeast India, Bangladesh, China, Indo-China, Malay peninsula, Indo-Malay, the Sundas, Philippines
 Oldham's leaf turtle Cyclemys oldhami Bangladesh, Cambodia, China, India, Indonesia, Laos, Malaysia, Myanmar, Thailand & Vietnam
 Spotted pond turtle Geoclemys hamiltonii Pakistan, India, Bangladesh, Nepal
 Cochin forest cane turtle Vijayachelys silvatica (=Geoemyda silvatica) Southwest India
 Crowned river turtle Hardella thurjii Pakistan, India, Bangladesh 
 Three-striped roofed turtle Kachuga dhongoka North India, Nepal, Bangladesh
 Painted roofed turtle Kachuga kachuga North India, Nepal, Bangladesh
 Brown roofed turtle Kachuga smithii Pakistan, North India, Nepal, Bangladesh
 Assam roofed turtle Kachuga sylhetensis Northeast India, Bangladesh
 Indian roofed turtle Kachuga tecta Pakistan, North India, Nepal, Bangladesh
 Indian tent turtle Kachuga tentoria India, Bangladesh
 Tricarinate hill turtle Melanochelys tricarinata India, Nepal, Bangladesh
 Indian black turtle Melanochelys trijuga India, Nepal, Sri Lanka, Bangladesh, Myanmar, Thailand
 Indian eyed turtle Morenia petersi Eastern India, Bangladesh
 Malayan flat-shelled turtle Notochelys platynota
 Keeled box turtle Pyxidea mouhotii
 Arakan forest turtle Heosemys depressa

Family Trionychidae 
 Indian softshell turtle Aspideretes gangeticus Pakistan, India, Nepal, Bangladesh
 Indian peacock softshell turtle Aspideretes hurum India, Nepal, Bangladesh
 Leith's softshell turtle Aspideretes leithii Peninsular India
 Black softshell turtle Aspideretes nigricans Chittagong city tank in southeast Bangladesh
 Narrow-headed softshell turtle Chitra indica Pakistan, India, Nepal, Bangladesh
 Indian flapshell turtle Lissemys punctata Pakistan, India, Nepal, Bangladesh, Sri Lanka, Myanmar
 Asian giant softshell turtle Pelochelys cantorii India (coasts), Malay peninsula, Indo-China, South China

Order Squamata

Suborder Lacertilia

Family Eublepharidae 
 Indian fat-tailed gecko Eublepharis fuscus Western India
 Hardwicke's fat-tailed gecko Eublepharis hardwickii Eastern and central India
 Pakistani leopard gecko Eublepharis macularius Pakistan, Northwest India

Family Gekkonidae 
 Böhme's mountain gecko Alsophylax boehmei
 Baluch rock gecko Bunopus tuberculatus Afghanistan, Pakistan, India, Nepal
 Indian golden gecko Calodactylodes aureus Eastern Ghats
 Sri Lankan golden gecko Calodactylus illingworthi Sri Lanka
 Assamese day geckoCnemaspis assamensis, Assam
 Beddome's day gecko Cnemaspis beddomei
 Boie's day gecko Cnemaspis boiei
 Goan day gecko Cnemaspis goaensis
 Gund day gecko Cnemaspis heteropholis
 Indian day gecko Cnemaspis indica
 Indraneil day gecko Cnemaspis indraneildasii
 Jerdon's day gecko Cnemaspis jerdonii
 Kandy day gecko, Cnemaspis kandiana
 Kolhapur day gecko, Cnemaspis kolhapurensis
 Coastal day gecko Cnemaspis littoralis
 Ponmudi day gecko Cnemaspis nairi
 Ornate day gecko Cnemaspis ornata
 Cnemaspis otai
 Sispara day gecko Cnemaspis sisparensis
 Rough-bellied day gecko Cnemaspis tropidogaster
 Wynaad day gecko Cnemaspis wynadensis
 Yercaud day gecko Cnemaspis yercaudensis
 Flat-tailed gecko Cosymbotus platyurus Bhutan, India, Nepal, Sri Lanka, China, Indo-China, Malay region
 Sind gecko Crossobamon orientalis
 Cyrtodactylus adleri
 Cyrtodactylus aravallensis
 Kollegal ground gecko Geckoella collegalensis
 Gunther's Indian gecko Cyrtodactylus deccanensis
 Giant forest gecko Cyrtodactylus frenatus Sri Lanka
 Sikkim bent-toed gecko Cyrtodactylus gubernatoris
 Khasi Hills bent-toed gecko Cyrtodactylus khasiensis
 Jammu bent-toed gecko Cyrtodactylus mansarulus
 Geckoella nebulosa (=Gymnodactlus nebulosus, Cyrtodactylus nebulosus)
 Cyrtodactylus nepalensis
 Malayan forest gecko Cyrtodactylus pulchellus
 Andamans bent-toed gecko Cyrtodactylus rubidus India (Andamans)
 Frontier bow-fingered gecko Cyrtodactylus stoliczkai
 Mediodactylus walli
 Cyrtopodion baturensis
 Banded bent-toed gecko Cyrtopodion fasciolatus
 Himalayan bent-toed gecko Cyrtopodion himalayanus
 Kutch gecko Cyrtopodion kachhensis
 Lawder's bent-toed gecko Cyrtopodion lawderanus
 Rough-tailed gecko Cyrtopodion scabrum
 Siamese leaf-toed gecko Dixonius siamensis
 Patinghe Indian gecko Geckoella jeyporensis
 Devil gecko Geckoella yakhuna Sri Lanka
 Four-clawed gecko Gehyra mutilata South India, Sri Lanka, Myanmar, Indo-China, Malay region
 Tokay gecko Gekko gekko Northeast India, Indo-China, China, Malay region
 Smith's giant gecko Gekko smithii India (Nicobar), Myanmar, Thailand, Malay region
 Andamanese giant gecko Gekko verreauxi India (Andamans)
 White-striped viper gecko Hemidactylus albofasciatus
 Hemidactylus anamallensis
 Bowring's gecko Hemidactylus bowringii Eastern India, Myanmar, China
 Brook's gecko Hemidactylus brookii Pakistan, India, Sri Lanka, Nepal, Bhutan, Myanmar, Singapore, Malay region
 Depressed gecko Hemidactylus depressus Sri Lanka
 Yellow-spotted gecko Hemidactylus flaviviridis Pakistan, India, Iran
 Asian house gecko Hemidactylus frenatus South India, Sri Lanka, Indo-China, China, Malay region, tropical areas
 Giant leaf-toed gecko Hemidactylus giganteus
 Garnott's gecko Hemidactylus garnotii Northeast India, Bhutan, Nepal, Malay region
 Graceful leaf-toed gecko Hemidactylus gracilis
 Carrot-tail viper gecko Hemidactylus imbricatus
 Marbled tree gecko Hemidactylus leschenaultii Pakistan, India, Sri Lanka
 Burmese leaf-toed gecko Hemidactylus karenorum
 Spotted rock gecko Hemidactylus maculatus Southwest India, Sri Lanka
 Hemidactylus mahendrai
 Smith's bent-toed gecko Hemidactylus malcolmsmithi
 Persian leaf-toed gecko Hemidactylus persicus
 Hemidactylus porbandarensis
 Bombay leaf-toed gecko Hemidactylus prashadi
 Reticulate leaf-toed gecko Hemidactylus reticulatus
 Scaly gecko Hemidactylus scabriceps South India, Sri Lanka
 Hemidactylus subtriedrus
 Termite hill gecko Hemidactylus triedrus Pakistan, India
 Mediterranean house gecko Hemidactylus turcicus
 Hemiphyllodactylus aurantiacus
 Indopacific tree gecko Hemiphyllodactylus typus
 Mourning gecko Lepidodactylus lugubris
 Andaman day gecko Phelsuma andamanense India (Andamans)
Nicobar gliding gecko Ptychozoon nicobarensis India (Nicobar)
 Smooth-backed gliding gecko Ptychozoon lionotum

Family Agamidae 
 Laungwala long-headed lizard (Bufoniceps laungwalaensis) Rajasthan
 Green crestless forest lizard (Calotes andamanensis) Andaman and Nicobar Islands, India
 Orange-lipped forest lizard (Calotes aurantolabium) Southern Western Ghats, sp. nov.
 Green forest lizard (Calotes calotes) South India, Sri Lanka
 Emma gray's forest lizard (Calotes emma) northeast India.
 Large scaled forest lizard (Calotes grandisquamis) Western Ghats
 Jerdon's forest lizard (Calotes jerdoni) India (Khasi hills, Meghalaya), Myanmar, China
 Khasi Hills forest lizard (Calotes maria) India, Bangladesh
 Indo-Chinese forest lizard (Calotes mystaceus) Northeast India, Myanmar, Thailand, Cambodia, Vietnam
 Nilgiri forest lizard (Calotes nemoricola) India
 Black-lipped forest lizard (Calotes nigrilabris) Sri Lanka
 Oriental garden lizard (Calotes versicolor) Afghanistan, Pakistan, India (Andamans), Sri Lanka, Nepal, Bangladesh, Malay peninsula, Indo-China, China, Sumatra
 Rough-horned lizard (Ceratophora aspera) Sri Lanka
 Small-horned lizard (Cophotis ceylanica) Sri Lanka
 Bay Islands forest lizard (Coryphophylax subcristatus) India (Andaman and Nicobar islands)
 Blanford's flying lizard (Draco blanfordii) Northeast India, Bangladesh, Myanmar, Thailand, Malay peninsula
 South Indian flying lizard (Draco dussumieri) Western Ghats, India
 Tubercled agama (Laudakia tuberculata) Afghanistan, Pakistan, India, Nepal
 Hump-nosed lizard (Lyriocephalus scutatus) Sri Lanka
 Elliot's forest lizard (Monilesaurus ellioti) India.
 Roux forest lizard (Monilesaurus rouxii) India
 Indian kangaroo lizard (Otocryptis beddomei) India
 Sri Lankan kangaroo lizard (Otocryptis wiegmanni) Sri Lanka
 Rock lizard (Psammophilus dorsalis) South India
 Blanford's rock lizard (Psammophilus blanfordanus) South India
 Horsfield's spiny lizard (Salea horsfieldii) South India
 Anaimalai spiny lizard (Salea anamallayana) South India
 Fan-throated lizard (Sitana ponticeriana) India
 Sitana visiri
 Sitana laticeps
 Sitana spinaecephalus
 Sarada darwini
 Sarada superba
 Sitana marudhamneydhal
 Agile agama (Trapelus agilis) Iran, Afghanistan, Pakistan, Northwest India
 Indian spiny-tailed lizard (Uromastyx hardwickii) Pakistan, Northwest India

Family Chamaeleonidae 

 Indian chamaeleon Chamaeleo zeylanicus Pakistan, India, Sri Lanka

Family Dibamidae 
 Dibamus nicobaricum

Family Anguidae 

 Armoured glass snake Ophisaurus apodus Eurasia, Afghanistan, Pakistan
 Eastern glass snake Dopasia gracilis India (Himalayas, Northeast), Myanmar

Family Scincidae 
Note: Some authors move the Asian skinks of the genus Mabuya to Eutropis.

 Minor snake-eyed skink Ablepharus grayanus
 Asian snake-eyed skink Ablepharus pannonicus
 Asymblepharus tragbulense
 Barkud limbless skink Barkudia insularis India (East coast)
 Barkudia melanosticta
 Four-toed snake skink Chalcidoseps thwaitesii Sri Lanka
 Chalcides pentadactylus
 Dasia subcaeruleum Southwest India
 Dasia johsinghi Southwest India,
 Tree skink Dasia haliana Sri Lanka
 Olive tree skink Dasia olivacea India (Nicobars), Myanmar, Indo-China, Malay region
 Dasia nicobarensis
 Olive tree skink Dasia olivacea
 Boulenger's dasia Dasia subcaerulea
 Schneider's skink Eumeces schneiderii (Daudin, 1802)
 Eumeces blythianus
 Poona skink Eurylepis poonaensis (Sharma, 1970)
 Alpine Punjab skink Eurylepis taeniolatus Blyth, 1854
 Sharma's mabuya Eutropis nagarjuni (Sharma, 1969) Andhra Prade
 Kelaart's slender skink Lankascincus taprobanensis Sri Lanka
 Big-eared lipinia Lipinia macrotympanum (Stoliczka, 1873)
 Four-striped lipinia Lipinia quadrivittata (Peters, 1867)
 White-spotted supple skink Lygosoma albopunctatum (Gray, 1846)
 Lygosoma ashwamedhi Sharma, 1969
 Christmas Island grass-skink Lygosoma bowringii (Günther, 1864)
 Lygosoma goaensis (Sharma, 1976)
 Günther's writhing skink Lygosoma guentheri (Günther, 1864)
 Lygosoma lineata (Gray, 1839)
 Lygosoma pruthi (Sharma, 1977)
 Lygosoma punctata (Gmelin, 1799)
 Vosmer's writhing skink Lygosoma vosmaeri (Gray, 1839)
 Gunther's spotted skink Lygosoma guentheri Southwest India
 Mabuya allapallensis Schmidt, 1926
 Mabuya andamanensis Smith, 1935
 Beddome's skink Mabuya beddomii (Jerdon, 1870) Southwest India, Sri Lanka
 Bibron's skink Mabuya bibronii (Gray, 1838) Southeast India, Sri Lanka
 Common keeled skink Mabuya carinata (Schneider, 1801) Pakistan, India, Nepal, Bangladesh
 Inger's mabuya Mabuya clivicola Inger, Shaffer, Koshy & Bakde, 1984
 Striped grass skink Mabuya dissimilis (Hallowell, 1857) Pakistan, North India
 Mabuya gansi Das, 1991
 Blanford's mabuya Mabuya innotata (Blanford, 1870)
 Little Indian skink or bronze skink Mabuya macularia (Blyth, 1853) Bangladesh, India, Nepal, Pakistan, Sri Lanka, Myanmar, Thailand, Vietnam, Malay peninsula
 Many-lined skink Mabuya multifasciata (Kuhl, 1820) Northeast India (Nicobars), China, Malay region
 Nine-keeled skink Mabuya novemcarinata (Anderson, 1871) Northeast India, Myanmar, Malay peninsula
 Four-keeled skink Mabuya quadricarinata Boulenger, 1887 Northeast India, Myanmar
 Rough mabuya Mabuya rudis (Boulenger, 1887)
 Nicobar Island skink Mabuya rugifera (Stoliczka, 1870)
 Three-banded mabuya Mabuya trivittata (Hardwicke & Gray, 1827)
 Tytler's mabuya Mabuya tytleri (Tytler, 1868)
 Gray's snake skink Nessia burtonii Sri Lanka
 Deraniyagala's snake skink Nessia deraniyagalai Sri Lanka
 Two-toed snake skink Nessia didactylus Sri Lanka
 Shark-headed snake skink Nessia hickanala Sri Lanka
 Layard's snake skink Nessia layardi Sri Lanka
 One-toed snake skink Nessia monodactylus Sri Lanka
 Sarasin's snake skink Nessia sarasinorum Sri Lanka
 Eastern sandfish Ophiomorus raithmai Anderson & Leviton, 1966 Pakistan, Northwest India
 Three-toed snake skink Ophiomorus tridactylus (Blyth, 1853)
 Ristella beddomii Boulenger, 1887
 Günther's ristella Ristella guentheri Boulenger, 1887
 Rurk's ristella Ristella rurkii Gray, 1839
 Travancore ristella Ristella travancorica (Beddome, 1870)
 Scincella beddomei (Boulenger, 1887)
 Two-lined ground skink Scincella bilineata (Gray, 1846)
 Ladakh supple skink Scincella ladacensis (Günther, 1864) North India, Nepal
 Scincella macrotis (Steindachner, 1867)
 Scincella palnica (Boettger, 1892)
 Reeves' smooth gecko Scincella reevesii (Gray, 1838)
 Sikkimese supple skink Scincella sikkimensis (Blyth, 1854) Eastern India, Bangladesh, Bhutan, Nepal
 Scincella travancorica (Beddome, 1870)
 Sepsophis punctatus Beddome, 1870
 North Indian litter skink Sphenomorphus indicus (Gray, 1853) Tibet, India (Himalayas), Nepal, Bhutan, Myanmar, Thailand, Indo-China, China, Malay peninsula
 Sphenomorphus courcyanum (Annandale, 1912)
 Dussumier's forest skink Sphenomorphus dussumieri (Duméril & Bibron, 1839)
 Spotted forest skink Sphenomorphus maculatus (Blyth, 1853)

Family Lacertidae 
 Blanford's fringe-fingered lizard Acanthodactylus blanfordii
 Indian fringe-fingered lizard Acanthodactylus cantoris
 Small-spotted lizard Mesalina guttulata
 Beddome's snake-eye Ophisops beddomei
 Snake-eyed lizard Ophisops elegans
 Jerdon's snake-eye Ophisops jerdonii
 Leschenault's snake-eye Ophisops leschenaultii
 Ophisops microlepis
 Deraniyagala's striped lacerta Ophisops minor India, Sri Lanka
 Goalpara grass lizard Takydromus haughtonianus
 Java grass lizard Takydromus khasiensis
 Asian grass lizard Takydromus sexlineatus

Family Varanidae 

 Bengal monitor (Varanus bengalensis) Iran, Afghanistan, Pakistan, India, Nepal, Bangladesh, Sri Lanka, Myanmar
 Yellow monitor (Varanus flavescens) Pakistan, India, Nepal
 Desert monitor (Varanus griseus) Caspian Sea, Pakistan, Northwest India
 Water monitor (Varanus salvator) India, Sri Lanka, Indo-China, Malay region, Philippines

Suborder Sauria

Family Gymnothalmidae 
 Vanzosaura rubricauda (Boulenger, 1902)

Suborder Serpentes 

See List of snakes of South Asia

See also 
 Wildlife of India

Notes

References
 Romulus Whitaker & Ashok Captain, (2004) Snakes of India: The Field Guide. Draco Books, Chennai.
 Daniel, J.C.(2002) The Book of Indian Reptiles and Amphibians. Bombay Natural History Society and Oxford University Press. 
 Aengals, R., Kumar, S., Palot M.J. & S.R. Ganesh. 2018. A checklist of reptiles of India.ZSI publication.   https://www.researchgate.net/publication/326580194_A_Checklist_of_Reptiles_of_India

External links 
 Reptile database
 Indian snake checklist
 Herpetology in South Asia
 ReptileIndia Yahoo Group

South Asia